William Saunders Sebright Lascelles PC (29 October 1798 – 2 July 1851) was a British Whig politician. He served as Comptroller of the Household from 1847 to 1851.

Background
Lascelles was the third son of Henry Lascelles, 2nd Earl of Harewood and his wife Henrietta Sebright, daughter of Lieutenant-General Sir John Sebright, 6th Baronet. Edward Lascelles (1796–1839, Viscount Lascelles 1820–1839), Henry Lascelles, 3rd Earl of Harewood, and Edwin Lascelles were his brothers.

Political career
Lascelles was returned to Parliament for East Looe in 1826, a seat he held until 1830. He was subsequently MP for Northallerton from 1831 to 1832, for Wakefield from 1837 to 1841 and from 1842 to 1847 and for Knaresborough from 1847 to 1851. In 1847 he was sworn of the Privy Council and appointed Comptroller of the Household under Lord John Russell, a post he held until his death in 1851.

Cricket
Lascelles played first-class cricket in 1818. He is recorded in one match for E. H. Budd's XI, totalling 1 run with a highest score of 1.

Family
Lascelles married Lady Caroline Georgiana Howard (d. 1881), daughter of George Howard, 6th Earl of Carlisle, on 14 May 1823. They had ten children:

Georgiana Caroline Lascelles (1826-1911), married Charles William Grenfell, a grandson of William Molyneux, 2nd Earl of Sefton and had issue.
George Dacre Lascelles (1828-1829)
Henrietta Frances Lascelles (1830-1884), married William Cavendish, 2nd Baron Chesham and had issue.
Major Claude George William Lascelles (1831–1903), died unmarried.
Edwin Agar Lascelles (1833–1877), died unmarried.
Mary Louise Lascelles (c. 1835–1917), died unmarried.
Emma Elizabeth Lascelles (1838-1920), married Lord Edward Cavendish, son of William Cavendish, 7th Duke of Devonshire and had issue.
Sir Frank Cavendish Lascelles (1841–1920), married Mary Emma Olliffe and had issue.
Lieutenant-Colonel Henry Arthur Lascelles (1842–1913), married Caroline Maria Gore, sister of Charles Gore and had issue, including Sir Francis William Lascelles.
Beatrice Blanche Lascelles (1844-1915), married Frederick Temple, Archbishop of Canterbury.

Lascelles died on 2 July 1851, aged 52. Lady Caroline Lascelles died in November 1881.

References

External links 
 

1798 births
1851 deaths
English cricketers
English cricketers of 1787 to 1825
Members of the Parliament of the United Kingdom for English constituencies
Members of the Privy Council of the United Kingdom
UK MPs 1820–1826
UK MPs 1826–1830
UK MPs 1831–1832
UK MPs 1832–1835
UK MPs 1835–1837
UK MPs 1837–1841
UK MPs 1841–1847
UK MPs 1847–1852
Younger sons of earls
Members of the Parliament of the United Kingdom for constituencies in Cornwall
Politics of Wakefield
William
E. H. Budd's XI cricketers